Patrick McLaughlin (born 10 October 1979) is a Northern Irish football manager and former footballer who is currently manager of Cliftonville.

Beginning his career at Derry City, he went on to play with Institute, Finn Harps, and Coleraine. At 'Stute he served as club captain, leading them to promotion to the Premiership after winning the 2013-14 NIFL Championship.

He retired from playing in 2015 to take on the role of assistant manager under newly-appointed Institute boss Kevin Deery. He spent two years as assistant manager before succeeding Deery as manager following his resignation.

In his first season as manager he guided 'Stute back to the top flight of Northern Irish football by winning the 2017-18 NIFL Championship. 

After receiving much praise for his team's attacking playing-style during their Premiership return, McLaughlin found himself linked with the vacant managerial positions at a number of clubs including Coleraine, Derry City and Cliftonville.

On 4 February 2019 he was confirmed as the new manager of Cliftonville after being approached for the position 5 days prior.

On 13th March 2022 Paddy McLaughlin guided his Cliftonville side to victory over Coleraine in League Cup final at Windsor Park, to win the club's sixth league cup victory and his first major trophy at football club.

Honours

Playing
Institute
NIFL Championship: 2013–14

Manager
Institute
NIFL Championship: 2017–18

Cliftonville
County Antrim Shield: 2019–20
Irish League Cup: 2021–22

References

Football managers from Northern Ireland
Living people
1979 births
Sportspeople from Derry (city)
Republic of Ireland association footballers
Finn Harps F.C. players
Institute F.C. players
Institute F.C. managers
Derry City F.C. players
Coleraine F.C. players
NIFL Premiership managers
NIFL Premiership players
Association football central defenders
Cliftonville F.C. managers
League of Ireland players